The Jatinegara–Manggarai railway is a railway line in Indonesia.

References

3 ft 6 in gauge railways in Indonesia
Railway lines in Indonesia